Afromelittia is a genus of moths in the family Sesiidae.

Species
Afromelittia aenescens (Butler, 1896)
Afromelittia iridisquama (Mabille, 1890)
Afromelittia natalensis (Butler, 1874)
Afromelittia occidentalis (Le Cerf, 1917)

References

Sesiidae